In mathematics, the Bombieri norm, named after Enrico Bombieri, is a norm on homogeneous polynomials with coefficient in  or  (there is also a version for non homogeneous univariate polynomials). This norm has many remarkable properties, the most important being listed in this article.

Bombieri scalar product for homogeneous polynomials

To start with the geometry, the Bombieri scalar product for homogeneous polynomials with N variables can be defined as follows using multi-index notation:

by definition different monomials are orthogonal, so that
 if 

while  by definition 

In the above definition and in the rest of this article the following notation applies:

Bombieri inequality
The fundamental property of this norm is the Bombieri inequality:

Here the Bombieri inequality is the left hand side of the above statement, while the right side means that the Bombieri norm is an algebra norm. Giving the left hand side is meaningless without that constraint, because in this case, we can achieve the same result with any norm by multiplying the norm by a well chosen factor.

This multiplicative inequality implies that the product of two polynomials is bounded from below by a quantity that depends on the multiplicand polynomials. Thus, this product can not be arbitrarily small. This multiplicative inequality is useful in metric algebraic geometry and number theory.

Invariance by isometry
Another important property is that the Bombieri norm is invariant by composition with an 
isometry:

let  be two homogeneous polynomials of degree  with  variables and let  be an isometry
Then we have . When  this implies .

This result follows from a nice integral formulation of the scalar product:

 

Other inequalities
Let  be a homogeneous polynomial of degree  with  variables and let . We have:

 
 

where  denotes the Euclidean norm.

The Bombieri norm is useful in polynomial factorization, where it has some advantages over the Mahler measure, according to Knuth (Exercises 20-21, pages 457-458 and 682-684).

See also
Grassmann manifold
Hardy space
Homogeneous polynomial
Plücker embedding

References
  
 

Norms (mathematics)
Analytic number theory
Polynomials
Homogeneous polynomials
Complex analysis
Several complex variables